"Cowboy Take Me Away" is a song by recorded American country music group Dixie Chicks, written by Martie Maguire and Marcus Hummon.  It was released in November 1999 as the second single from their album Fly.  The song's title is derived from a famous slogan used in commercials for Calgon bath and beauty products. It reached number one on the U.S. Billboard Hot Country Singles and Tracks chart in February 2000.

Content
Driven by co-writer Martie Seidel's fiddle, Emily Robison's banjo, and Natalie Maines' vocals, "Cowboy Take Me Away" quickly became one of the trio's signature songs.  Maines was praised for a "sincere" vocal that escaped the clichés of "Nashville music-factory tearjerkers". "Cowboy Take Me Away" has become a staple of the Chicks' concert set lists, appearing from the Fly Tour onwards.

Cowboy Take Me Away played on a number of local Christian radio stations in Uganda.

Music video
The first scene of the music video for "Cowboy Take Me Away" shows a car stopping on a busy street, with Robison's high hot pink cowboy boot splashing through a puddle, and Maines waiting in a crowded elevator until reaching the top floor of an empty industrial-looking loft, joining the other two Chicks. The three begin singing the song and playing their instruments up there at the building-top in the center of a large city, resembling New York City.  Gradually, the scene around them begins to slowly melt (via various CGI backdrops) of forest floors and snow-covered mountains and the like appear, while the trio dance and sing. The city does not ever disappear entirely, but the point is made.

The filming captured them at the height of their early days, when all three women had hair either naturally or dyed blonde. Looking back, Robison commented, "You have three girls, so automatically you get the roll-the-eyes, you know; it's the band that's been put together," Robison says. "And at the time we were all blonde. And, you know, it was just so - it was so packageable. You know, it was just so easy for people to say, 'Oh, this is something manufactured.'"

Chart performance

Peak positions

Year-end charts

Certifications

References

Songs about cowboys and cowgirls
1999 singles
The Chicks songs
Songs written by Marcus Hummon
Song recordings produced by Paul Worley
Songs written by Martie Maguire
Monument Records singles
Song recordings produced by Blake Chancey
1999 songs